Thomas Tullidge Cullen (born 1977) is a United States district judge of the United States District Court for the Western District of Virginia. He was formerly United States Attorney for the same district.

Education and legal career 

Cullen received his Bachelor of Arts from Furman University cum laude in 2000 and his Juris Doctor from the William & Mary School of Law in 2004, where he was inducted into the Order of the Coif.  He was a law clerk to Judge Robert E. Payne of the United States District Court for the Eastern District of Virginia (2004-05) and to Judge Roger Gregory of the United States Court of Appeals for the Fourth Circuit (2005-06).

Cullen served as an assistant United States attorney for the Western District of North Carolina from 2006 to 2010 and for the Western District of Virginia from 2010 to 2013, where he was Deputy Criminal Chief. Before becoming U.S. Attorney, he was a Principal/Partner at Woods Rogers PLC in Roanoke, Virginia, from 2013 to 2018, representing clients in complex civil and criminal litigation.

U.S. attorney 

Cullen was recommended as a candidate for United States Attorney by Virginia Senators Mark Warner and Tim Kaine. On March 22, 2018, his nomination was reported out of committee by voice vote. He was confirmed by voice vote later the same day. He was sworn in on March 30, 2018. His tenure as U.S. Attorney ended on September 15, 2020, when he became a district judge.

Federal judicial service 

On December 18, 2019, President Donald Trump announced his intent to nominate Cullen to serve as a United States district judge of the United States District Court for the Western District of Virginia. On February 4, 2020, his nomination was sent to the Senate. President Trump nominated Cullen to the seat vacated by Judge Glen E. Conrad, who assumed senior status on December 11, 2017. On March 4, 2020, a hearing on his nomination was held before the Senate Judiciary Committee. On May 14, 2020, his nomination was reported out of committee by a 17–5 vote. On September 9, 2020, the United States Senate invoked cloture on his nomination by a 77–18 vote. On September 10, 2020, his nomination was confirmed by a 79–19 vote. He received his judicial commission on September 15, 2020.

Personal life 

His father is former Attorney General of Virginia Richard Cullen.

References

External links 
 

|-

1977 births
Living people
21st-century American lawyers
21st-century American judges
Assistant United States Attorneys
Federalist Society members
Furman University alumni
Judges of the United States District Court for the Western District of Virginia
People from Richmond, Virginia
Trump administration personnel
United States Attorneys for the Western District of Virginia
United States district court judges appointed by Donald Trump
Virginia lawyers
Virginia Republicans
William & Mary Law School alumni